Brian J. Boeck is an American historian. He obtained his doctorate in Russian history from Harvard University, and now teaches Russian and Soviet history at DePaul University in Chicago. His biography of the Soviet writer Mikhail Sholokhov was published to critical acclaim and was nominated for the 2020 Pushkin Book Prize.

References

American historians
DePaul University faculty
Harvard Graduate School of Arts and Sciences alumni
Year of birth missing (living people)
Living people